The OP800 was a lightweight, streamlined railcar built by the St. Louis Car Company in 1939. The units were configured in a highly unusual 2-A1A wheel arrangement (later converted to 3-A1A)  mounted atop a pair of road trucks, and equipped with a front swing coupler pilot. The aft section was divided into two separate compartments: one was used to transport baggage and the other served as a small railway post office, or RPO (the forward door, located just behind the radiator louvers, was equipped with a mail hook).

Six units, accompanied by matching trailing car sets, were manufactured exclusively for the Southern Railway. Two were later sold to the Georgia and Florida Railroad and Georgia Northern Railway as maintenance cars. The remaining four OP800s were scrapped in 1955; selected parts were retained for maintenance use on other SR F-M motive power.

At least four of these cars had individual names applied to them, including "Vulcan", "Cracker", "Joe Wheeler", and "Goldenrod".

No OP800 units survive.

See also
 Doodlebug (rail car)
 Seaboard Air Line 2027 & 2028, similar St. Louis Car Company built railcars, powered by EMD

References

Bibliography
 
 
 

OP800
Diesel locomotives of Southern Railway (U.S.)
North American streamliner trains
2-A1A locomotives
3-A1A locomotives
Passenger locomotives
Scrapped locomotives
Diesel-electric locomotives of the United States
Railway locomotives introduced in 1939
Standard gauge locomotives of the United States

Streamlined diesel locomotives